The Hulme F1 was a proposed sports car to be manufactured by New Zealand boutique company Hulme Supercars Ltd. Its name was a tribute to the 1967 Formula One World Champion, New Zealander Denny Hulme. It was to be powered by the 7.0 L LS7 V8 sourced from the Chevrolet Corvette C6 and produces .

External links
Hulme F1 Champion 1967 A New Zealand Supercar Unveiled
Hulme Supercar to Hit the Market in 2008
Hulme Supercar on display at the 34th Concours d'Elegance
2006 Hulme F1Champion1967
Hulme supercar to see production in 2008
Hulme F1: New Zealand's New Supercar
YouTube - Hulme Supercar
Company website
Proposed specifications

Sports cars
2000s cars
Cars of New Zealand